Countess Alfonsyna Miączyńska (1838-1919) was a Polish noblewoman and landowner.

Alfonsyna was owner of Pieniaki, Majdany and Zatożyce estates. She married Count Włodzimierz Dzieduszycki on September 19, 1853, in Lwów.

1838 births
1919 deaths
Alfonsyna
19th-century Polish nobility
20th-century Polish nobility
20th-century Polish landowners